Michael Robert Patrick Alford (born 15 September 1958 in Cookham, Berkshire, England) is a British figurative painter whose work includes landscapes, cityscapes, figures, portraits, nudes and murals.

Biography
Alford was born in Cookham, England, and grew up in England and Germany. He attended the Dragon School and later Rugby School. His first art training came from his father, an officer in the Royal Engineers, who taught him how to draw in perspective at an early age. After a period in the Royal Marines, he attended Durham University (St John's College) where he took a degree in Spanish and Arabic. Later he traveled extensively in South America and the Middle East, documenting his trips in a series of detailed sketchbooks. He received further art training at the Slade and Chelsea schools of art before beginning his career as a muralist and fine arts painter, exhibiting widely in the UK, the US and Europe. Michael Alford lives in London but travels widely seeking new subjects.

Career

Alford exhibits work in group and solo shows in galleries including Wimbledon Fine Arts; Panter and Hall Galleries; Chloe Gallery, San Francisco, Mall Galleries with the Royal Institute of Oil Painters and Duncan Campbell Fine Art.

Alford has been an official War Artist to the British Military on three occasions. In 2010 he accompanied the Grenadier Guards to Afghanistan, where he created a series of watercolors based on his experience in the field. He donated the collection to the Colonel's Fund, the Grenadier Guards' charity for wounded Guards, their families, and the families of Guards killed in action His painting, Patrol at Pan Kalay Police Station, 2016, was acquired by the National Army Museum.

Alford's works are in corporate holdings including Berkeley Square Gallery; Hill & Knowlton; Sheraton Hotel, Amsterdam; Claridges; and Trust House Forte.

Michael was a council member of the Chelsea Art Society from 2011 to 2017. In 2017 he was a semi-finalist in Sky Arts Landscape artist of the year.

He is the recipient of the ROI Stanley Grimm Prize (2016), the Agnes Reeve Memorial Prize (2000) and the Primaluce International Trompe L'Oeil Festival Third Place Prize (2003).

References

External links
 
 CV hosted by Panter and Hall
 Michael Alford: War Paint
 Michael Alford appears in Sky Arts Landscape Artist of the Year 2017
 When the Writing's On the Wall, article on mural painting in The Guardian by Tim Hitchcock

20th-century English painters
English male painters
21st-century English painters
1958 births
Living people
Alumni of the Slade School of Fine Art
Alumni of St John's College, Durham
People educated at The Dragon School
People educated at Rugby School
20th-century English male artists
21st-century English male artists